, or Married Couple Rocks, are a kind of rock formation seen as religiously significant in Shinto. They are a subtype of Iwakura rock.

According to Shinto, the rocks represent the union of the creator kami, Izanagi and Izanami. The rocks, therefore, celebrate the union in marriage of man and woman.

The most famous pair is the pair at Futami Okitama Shrine in Futami-ura, two rocky stacks off the coast from Ise, Mie, Japan. They are joined by a shimenawa (a heavy rope of rice straw) and are considered sacred by worshippers of the shrine. The shimenawa, composed of five separate strands which each weigh 40 kilograms, must be replaced several times a year in a special ceremony. The larger rock, said to be male, has a small torii at its peak.At dawn during the summer, the sun appears to rise between the two rocks. Mount Fuji is visible in the distance. At low tide, the rocks are not separated by water.

Okitama Shrine is dedicated to Sarutahiko Ōkami and imperial food goddess Ukanomitama. There are numerous statues of frogs around the shrine. The shrine and the two rocks are near the Grand Shrine of Ise, the most important location of purification in Shinto.

Outline 
It is also a symbol and prayer for "marital bliss and domestic safety", "maritime security and a good catch of fish", and is said to be a symbol of Iwakura Shinko in Kojindo, which means a symbolic place or object in Nature, especially megaliths, rocks, and mountains, were considered Shintais and believed to be places where Kamis resided. For this reason, shimenawas and toriis were decorated as proof that a deity resided there (kanzumaru).

It is also an embodiment of the concept of the two sides of the same coin that pervades ancient Shinto and current shintos, such as the idea that this world consists of Utsushi-yo and Tokoyo, and the Seven Lucky Gods of Ebisu and Daikoku, two of the Seven Lucky Gods, are believed to be one, and the counting of chopsticks and footwear as one set or one pair is also said to be unique to Japan.

In the Kojiki, there are many Myths about married couples, from Izanami and Izanagi to Sarutahiko Ōkami and Ame-no-Uzume. It is thought that these became Sai no Kami and Dosojin, and were connected with the belief in a rock formation. This is why Jizos and Dōsojin are often depicted as a couple or as a pair of large and small rocks or stone statues. This kind of belief in married couples has spread throughout the world over time and has become familiar in the form of married couple's bowls, etc. At the same time, it is deeply related to the belief in child-rearing and child-bearing in the framework of family, such as householder and home. The 'Iwana' are deeply related to the belief in child-bearing, child-rearing, and the treasure of children.

These ideas of rock-building belief, Omote-Taiwanai and matrimonial belief (also called matrimonial harmony, which is the basis of ancestral spirit belief) are combined to form the object of enshrinement at the couple's rock.

Oshimenawa 
An example of an oshimenawa is Tateishi in Futami Towne, Ise City, Mie Prefecture. The large shimenawa rope connecting Tateishi and Nejiriwa, known as "husband and wife rocks," is believed to be the torii (gateway) to the offshore Kohtama Shrine stone, and is reattached three times a year in December (before the New Year), May, and September. During the shimenawa-renawa-renawa-renawa-renawa-renawa-renawa-renawa ceremony, a woodcarving song is sung, and some people take pieces of the old rope home as a good-luck charm for marital bliss.

Influence 
American composer Roger Reynolds took reference to the form of Meoto Iwa in Futami, where he visited in 1966, while composing the first movement "Futami ga Ura" of his second symphony, "Symphony [Myths]" (1990). Divided into 3 sections, the first and the last with "densely stratified texture" represent Izanagi and Izanami rocks respectively, and the middle section represents the space in-between.

National Married Couple Rocks Summit 
The National Married Couple Rocks Summit Liaison Council has been formed by 10 tourist spots in Japan that have married couple rocks or rocks for married couples, and is holding the National Married Couple Rocks Summit.

Married Couple Rocks Around Japan

Hokkaido District 

 Hokkaido Samani County Samani Town, Oyakoiwa (parent and child rocks)
 Oyakoiwa, a couple of rocks in Uryū County Horokanai Town, Hokkaido
 Meotoiwa, a couple rocks in Kamifurano Town, Hokkaido Sorachi District.
 Meotoiwa (married couple rocks) in Kamikawa County Wassamu Town, Hokkaido
 Fuufu Iwa (Couple Rocks) in Shari-gun Shari Town, Hokkaido
 Meotoiwa (Couple Rocks) in Akkeshi County, Hokkaido Akkeshi Town.

Tohoku District 

 Aomori Prefecture Shimokita County Kazamaura Village, Futamiwa
 Meotoiwa in Kitatsugaru District Nakadomari Town, Aomori Prefecture
 Iwate Prefecture Ichinoseki City, Senmaya Town
 Meotoiwa (married couple rocks) in Ninohe City, Iwate Prefecture; see Basenkyo for details *
 Couple rocks in Kuji City, Iwate Prefecture, see Kosode Beach for more information.
 Kesen County Sumita Town, Iwate Prefecture
 Miyagi Prefecture Igu District Marumori-cho
 Fukushima Prefecture Shirakawa City

Kanto Region 

 Meotoiwa in Nikko City, Tochigi Prefecture
 Gunma Prefecture Tone District, Gunma Minakami, Gunma

Chubu Region 

 Niigata Prefecture Joetsu City
 Sado City, Niigata Prefecture
 Hatagoiwa, also known as Noto Futami*, in Shiga Town, Ishikawa Prefecture.
 Fukui Prefecture Fukui City's Meotoiwa (Couple Rocks)
 Meotoiwa, a couple of rocks in Mikatakaminaka County Wakasa Town, Fukui Prefecture
 Nagano Prefecture Nakano City
 Minamisaku-gun, Nanamaki Village, Nagano Prefecture
 Kamiminouchi District Ogawa Village, Nagano Prefecture, Japan
 Gifu Prefecture Nakatsugawa City, Meotoiwa*]
 Shizuoka Prefecture Kamo District Matsuzaki Town

Kinki Region 

 Mie Prefecture Ise City, Tateishi (立石) in E, Futami Town. It is often called Meotoiwa (married couple rock) or Myotoiwa. See Futami Okitama Shrine for details. *
 Shima City, Mie Prefecture Shima City, Meotoiwa (married couple's rock) in Tategami, Ago Town.
 Shiga Prefecture Higashi-ohmi City, Meotoiwa (husband and wife rocks) → See Aga Shrine for details.
 Osaka Prefecture Takatsuki City's Meotoiwa (couple rocks).
 Hyōgo Prefecture Takarazuka City

Chugoku Region 

 Okayama Prefecture Bizen City
 Meotoiwa, husband and wife rocks in Takahashi City, Okayama Prefecture
 "Meotoiwa" (couple rocks) in Hiroshima Prefecture Etajima City, Hiroshima Prefecture
 Higashi Hiroshima City, Hiroshima Prefecture
 Yamaguchi Prefecture Shimonoseki City, Yamaguchi Prefecture
 Meotoiwa (Couple Rocks) in Shunan City, Yamaguchi Prefecture

Shikoku Region 

 Tokushima Prefecture Naruto City, Meotoiwa
 Ehime Prefecture Matsuyama City's Meotoiwa. Also known as Iyo Futami (Iyo Futami, Iyo no Futami). * Kashima Island
 Meotoiwa (Couple Rocks) in Yawatahama City, Ehime Prefecture.
 Meotoiwa (Couple Rocks) in Kita-uwa County Onikita Town, Ehime Prefecture
 Kochi Prefecture Kōnan City's Meotoiwa*.
 Meotoiwa (Couple Rocks) in Muroto City, Kochi Prefecture
 Meotoiwa, a couple rocks in Nagaoka County Otoyo Town, Kochi Prefecture

Kyushu Region 

 Fukuoka Prefecture Yame City's Meotoiwa*]
 Meotoiwa*, Futamigaura, Itoshima City, Fukuoka Prefecture
 Meotoiwa (Couple Rocks) in Minami Ward, Fukuoka City, Fukuoka Prefecture
 Meotoishi (couple rocks) in Kasuya County Shingu Town, Fukuoka Prefecture
 Nagasaki Prefecture Nagasaki City, Fuufu Iwa
 Meotoiwa, a couple rocks in Sasebo City, Nagasaki Prefecture
 Oiwa Meiwa* in Saga Takeo City, Saga Prefecture
 Meotoishi, a couple stones in Nishimatsuura-gun Arita Town, Saga Prefecture
 Kumamoto Prefecture Kuma County Asagiri Town, Meotoiwa
 Bungo Futami in Oita Prefecture Saiki City
 Myotoishi, Kunisaki City, Oita Prefecture
 Yin-Yang stones in Kobayashi City, Miyazaki Prefecture
 Kagoshima Prefecture Kumage County Nakatane Town, Meotoiwa

Okinawa Region 

 Meotoze in Okinawa Prefecture Naha City
 Mihugaru (Female rock) in Shimajiri-gun Kumejima Town, Okinawa Prefecture

See also 

 Futami-ura
 Futami Okitama Shrine
 Kashima Island

References

External links 

 Japan-guide
 A Day Tripper's Guide to Ise and Toba Japanzine By Zack Davisson

Gender and religion
Sexuality in Shinto
Places of Scenic Beauty
Stone (material)
Pages with unreviewed translations
Tourist attractions in Mie Prefecture
Stacks of Japan
Landforms of Mie Prefecture
Rock formations of Japan
Coasts of Japan
Shinto in Japan
Sacred rocks